The Italian Job is a video game based on the 1969 film of the same name, developed by Pixelogic and first published for PlayStation to European markets by SCi and Sold Out in 2001, and to North American markets by Rockstar Games in 2002. A port of the game for Microsoft Windows was released in Europe by the then-rebranded SCi Games, and in North America by Global Star Software, in 2002. The game features a story mode based on the film, and a multiplayer "party" mode where players compete through several different circuits in London and Turin, as well as a single player practice mode where the player can develop skills needed for completing the story mode. The game features representations of London and Turin that the player can drive around freely within a sandbox mode, in a range of cars including the Mini.

Production
The game was developed in conjunction with Pixelogic's Continuous Ordered Scenery Streaming (COSS) technology. This allowed designers to plan and design the "vast environments" required for effectively recreating complex scenes from the film, notably "The Escape Route". The city layouts were modeled using 3DS Max.  Phil Cornwell impersonated the voice of Michael Caine as the main character, Charlie Croker.

Reception  

The Italian Job "mixed or average" reviews, according to review aggregator Metacritic.

References

External links

2001 video games
Global Star Software games
Multiplayer and single-player video games
PlayStation (console) games
Racing video games
RenderWare games
Rockstar Games games
Video games based on films
Video games developed in the United Kingdom
Video games scored by Allister Brimble
Video games set in Italy
Video games set in London
Video games set in Switzerland
Windows games